The North Dakota Attorney General is the chief legal officer of the North Dakota state government. The Attorney General's office represents the state government in court cases and issues opinions of points of law upon request. Drew Wrigley was appointed to the position on February 8, 2022, to finish the term of Wayne Stenehjem, who died in office.

History
Since the creation of the office by the state's constitution in 1889, the state has seen a total of 28 Attorneys General. The office has been known to change hands rather quickly. The office has been held by the North Dakota Republican Party for a wide majority of its existence; only three of the 28 Attorneys General were from the state's Democratic Party and two Attorneys General ran on the Non Partisan League-ticket. The Attorney General originally served a two-year term, but this was extended to four in 1964 by a constitutional amendment.

Oversight
The Office of the Attorney General oversees the state Bureau of Criminal Investigation, the office of the state Fire Marshall, and is charged with enforcement of the state open meetings and open records laws.  The Attorney General is also responsible for gambling regulations (except horse betting), overseeing the state's lottery and charitable gaming, as well as the intergovernmental compacts related to Native American gaming within North Dakota.

See also
List of attorneys general of North Dakota

References

External links
 North Dakota Attorney General official website
 North Dakota Attorney General articles at ABA Journal
 News and Commentary at FindLaw
 North Dakota Century Code at Law.Justia.com
 U.S. Supreme Court Opinions - "Cases with title containing: State of North Dakota" at FindLaw
 State Bar Association of North Dakota
 North Dakota Attorney General Wayne Stenehjem profile at National Association of Attorneys General
 Press releases at North Dakota Attorney General

 
1889 establishments in North Dakota